The Muş massacre was a massacre committed by the Turkish Armed Forces on October 3, 1993, in the town of Vartinis in the province of Muş, Turkey. In total 9 people (7 of them children) were killed.

References 

Massacres in Turkey